Jerome Chen is a Chinese American visual effects supervisor and director. He is a founding member of Sony Pictures Imageworks.

He was nominated for an Academy Award for Best Visual Effects at the 72nd Academy Awards for his work on Stuart Little, shared with John Dykstra, Henry F. Anderson III, and Eric Allard.

He also shares several patents for facial/body motion capture and interactive camera technologies.

Partial filmography
 James and the Giant Peach (1996) (computer graphics supervisor)
 Contact (1996) (computer graphics supervisor)
 Stuart Little (1999) (visual effects supervisor)
 Stuart Little 2 (2002) (visual effects supervisor)
 The Polar Express (2004) (visual effects supervisor)
 Beowulf (2007) (senior visual effects supervisor)
 The Amazing Spider-Man (2012) (visual effects supervisor)
 The Amazing Spider-Man 2 (2014) (visual effects supervisor)
 Fury (2014) (visual effects supervisor)
 Suicide Squad (2016) (visual effects supervisor)
 Jumanji: Welcome to the Jungle (2017) (visual effects supervisor)
 Men in Black: International (2019) (visual effects supervisor)
 Love, Death, & Robots: Lucky 13 (2019) (director)
 Love, Death, & Robots: In Vaulted Halls Entombed (2022) (director)

References

External links

https://www.imageworks.com/our-team/jerome-chen

Living people
Special effects people
Visual effects supervisors
1963 births